Lechaio is a village in the municipal unit of Assos-Lechaio in Corinthia, Greece. It is situated on the coast of the Gulf of Corinth, 8 km west of Corinth and 12 km southeast of Kiato. The Greek National Road 8 passes through the town. It had a railway station on the Piraeus–Patras railway, but passenger service on this line was halted in 2009.

Historical population

History

Ancient Lechaeum was one of the ports of Ancient Corinth. It was connected to Corinth by a pair of strong walls. In the 390 BC Battle of Lechaeum, a Spartan mora (regiment) was defeated by the Athenians led by Iphicrates at Lechaeum.

The small airport was built by the Germans in the World War II to serve as a military air-base for the control of the south-eastern Mediterranean area. In tunnels under the airport, a large inventory of weapons and many barrels of oil were stored by the German army.

See also
List of settlements in Corinthia

References

External links 
Early Christian Basilica of Lechaion
Corinthian Monuments - Lechaion Road
Lechaion Road 
 Lechaio (in German)
GTP - Lechaio
GTP - Ancient Lechaeum

Cities in ancient Peloponnese
Populated places in Corinthia